The 2018 COSAFA U-20 Cup was the 25th edition of the COSAFA U-20 Challenge Cup, an international youth competition open to national associations of the COSAFA region. It took place between 30 November and 13 December in Zambia.

The competition was open to players born on or after 1 January 1999.

Participants
The 12 participating teams were announced on 25 October.

 (replaced Réunion)

Réunion were initially set to take part but withdrew after Réunionese Football League were unable to organise flights to Zambia. They were replaced on 2 November with Democratic Republic of the Congo.

Namibia withdrew on 30 November, leaving no time to find a replacement.

Match officials

Referees
 Nehemia Shoovaleka (Namibia) 
 Audrick Nkole (Zambia) 
 António Dungula (Angola) 
 Osiase Koto (Lesotho) 
 Alfred Chilinda (Malawi) 
 Derrick Kafuli (Zambia)
 Pilan Ncube (Zimbabwe) 
 Thulani Sibandze (Swaziland) 

Assistant Referees
 Shailesh Gobin (Mauritius)
 Pierre Jean Eric Andrivoavonjy (Madagascar)
 Venestancio Cossa (Mozambique)
 Edgar Rumeck (Zimbabwe)
 Petros Mbingo (Swaziland)
 Edward Kambatuwa (Malawi)
 Mogomotsi Morakile (Botswana)
 Thomas Kaela (Zambia)
 Oliver Mweene (Zambia)

Venues

Draw

The draw took place on 31 October 2018.

Groups

Group A

Group B

Group C

Knockout stage

Semifinals

Third-Place

Final

References

U-20
2018
2018 in Zambian sport
International association football competitions hosted by Zambia
December 2018 sports events in Africa